Kulna is a village in Lääne-Harju Parish, Harju County in northern Estonia.

Kulna has a station on the Elron western route.

References

Villages in Harju County